Bishnupur is a census town in the Rajarhat CD block in the  Bidhannagar subdivision of the North 24 Parganas district in the state of West Bengal, India.

Geography

Location                            

Area overview
Rajarhat, a rural area earlier, adjacent to Kolkata, is being transformed into an upmarket satellite township, with modern business hubs, luxury real estate and eye-catching shopping malls. With enormous construction activity taking place all around, things are changing fast, leaving behind a description at any given point of time as outdated in no time. Bidhannagar subdivision consists of Bidhannagar Municipality, Mahishbathan II Gram Panchayat and Rajarhat-Gopalpur Municipality (subsequently merged to form Bidhannagar Municipal Corporation since 2015), including Nabadiganta Industrial Township (Bidhannagar Sector - V) and Rajarhat (Community development block).

Note: The map alongside presents some of the notable locations in the subdivision. All places marked in the map are linked in the larger full screen map.

Demographics
According to the 2011 Census of India, Bishnupur had a total population of 12,660, of which 6,473 (51%) were males and 6,187 (49%) were females. Population in the age range 0–6 years was 1,549. The total number of literate persons in  Bishnupur was 9,332 (83.99% of the population over 6 years).

Infrastructure
According to the District Census Handbook, North Twenty Four Parganas,  2011, Bishnupur covered an area of 3.8512 km2. It had 6 km roads, with open drains. The protected water-supply involved tap water from untreated sources, hand pumps. It had 600 domestic electric connections. Among the medical facilities it had 1 medicine shop. Among the educational facilities, it had 4 primary schools, 1 middle school,  1 secondary school, 1 senior secondary school. The nearest college was 6 km away at New Town. It is well known for brick and readymix cement.

Healthcare
Rekjoani Rural Hospital at Rekjuani with 30 beds functions as the main medical facility in Rajarhat CD block.

References

Cities and towns in North 24 Parganas district